Killing in Istanbul (originally Kilink Istanbul'da) is a 1967 Turkish Fantasy and Adventure film directed by Yilmaz Atadeniz, and based on the Italian comic book character, Killing.

Cast 
Irfan Atasoy as Orhan "Uçan Adam"
Pervin Par as Gül
Muzaffer Tema as Prof. Cemil
Yıldırım Gencer as Kilink (uncredited)
Suzan Avci as Kilink's Lover
Hüseyin Peyda as Police chief
Sevinç Pekin
Mine Soley as Professor's secretary
Ergun Köknar
Feridun Çölgeçen as Prof. Maxwell
Hüseyin Zan as Oski
Mete Mert
Enver Dönmez
Muammer Gözalan as Prof. Houloussi

External links 

1967 films
Turkish crime films
1960s crime films
Turkish adventure films
1960s fantasy adventure films
1960s Turkish-language films
Turkish black-and-white films
Films set in Istanbul
1960s serial killer films
Turkish superhero films
1960s superhero films
Unofficial film adaptations